The Women's high jump competition at the 1976 Summer Olympics in Montreal was held on 26–28 July.

Results

Qualification
The qualification was set to 1.80 metres. A total of 21 athletes achieved this height.

Final

References

External links
 Official report

Athletics at the 1976 Summer Olympics
High jump at the Olympics
1976 in women's athletics
Women's events at the 1976 Summer Olympics